Pan Cheng-tsung  (born 12 November 1991), known professionally as C. T. Pan, is a Taiwanese professional golfer who currently competes on the PGA Tour.  

In 2019, Pan became just the second Taiwanese golfer to win on the PGA Tour. He has represented Taiwan as an amateur on the 2006 Eisenhower Trophy team, and then again in the 2014 tournament. He won two gold medals in golf – one individually and one for team play – at the 2014 Asian Games., represented Taiwan in the 2016 World Cup of Golf and played in the 2019 Presidents Cup for the international team. He won a bronze medal for Taiwan in the 2020 Olympics.

Early and personal life
Pan was born in Miaoli County, Taiwan. His father, a caddie who guided Pan into the sport, died in 2010. Pan was enrolled at the IMG Golf Academy for three years prior to attending the University of Washington.

He is married to Michelle Lin, who is also now his caddie.

College career
Pan played college golf at the University of Washington where he won eight events. He was the number one amateur golfer in the World Amateur Golf Ranking for eight weeks in 2013.

Professional career
Pan was one of two local golfers to make the cut at the 2015 U.S. Open at Chambers Bay in University Place, Washington. He finished tied for 64th in the tournament. Pan earned his first professional win on 12 July 2015 at The Players Cup on PGA Tour Canada, his second tournament on the tour and fourth tournament as a pro.

In December 2015, Pan tied for 14th at the final stage of the Web.com Tour qualifying tournament. He then finished 11th in the 2016 Web.com Tour season earnings, which got him a PGA Tour card for the 2017 season.

2017
In 2017, Pan competed in 29 PGA Tour events, making the cut in 14, including 3 top-10 finishes. His best finish was a tie for second on January 29 at the Farmers Insurance Open at Torrey Pines in San Diego, California. For the season, he earned $1,267,649 in official money and finished 88th in the FedEx cup standings.

2018
In 2018, Pan competed in 30 PGA Tour events, making the cut in 22, including 2 top-10 finishes. His best finish was a tie for second on August 19, 2018, at the Wyndham Championship at Sedgefield Country Club in Greensboro, North Carolina. For the season, he earned $1,881,787 in official money and finished 35th in the FedEx cup standings.

2019
On 21 April 2019, Pan earned his first PGA Tour victory at the RBC Heritage on Hilton Head Island, South Carolina. He became the second Taiwanese golfer to win on the PGA Tour after Chen Tze-chung who won at the 1987 Los Angeles Open.

In December 2019, Pan played on the International team at the 2019 Presidents Cup at Royal Melbourne Golf Club in Australia. The U.S. team won 16–14. Pan went 2–1–0 and lost his Sunday singles match against Patrick Reed.

2020
Pan spent the year on the PGA Tour, with the highlight being a tie for 7th in the 2020 Masters Tournament, his first appearance at the Augusta, including a final round of 68 (−4). Pan took advantage of the opportunity, trying all the sandwiches at the clubhouse, declaring the egg salad sandwich his favorite.

2021
In August 2021, Pan earned a bronze medal in the 2020 Olympics. He finished on −15, despite shooting +3 in round 1. He defeated 6 other players in the bronze medal tiebreaker, securing the medal with a par on the fourth extra hole.

Amateur wins
2011 Azalea Invitational, Prestige at PGA West
2012 Kikkor Golf Husky Invitational
2013 NCAA Tallahassee Regional, Kikkor Golf Husky Invitational
2015 The Amer Ari Invitational, Querencia Cabo Collegiate, Lamkin Grips SD Classic (tie), NCAA Bremerton Regional

Source:

Professional wins (4)

PGA Tour wins (1)

PGA Tour Canada wins (2)

Other wins (1)

Playoff record
Web.com Tour playoff record (0–1)

Results in major championships
Results not in chronological order in 2020.

CUT = missed the half-way cut
"T" = tied
NT = No tournament due to COVID-19 pandemic

Results in The Players Championship

"T" indicates a tie for a place
CUT = missed the halfway cut
C = Cancelled after the first round due to the COVID-19 pandemic

Results in World Golf Championships

1Cancelled due to COVID-19 pandemic

NT = No tournament
"T" indicates a tie for a place.

Team appearances
Amateur
Eisenhower Trophy (representing Taiwan): 2006, 2014

Professional
World Cup (representing Taiwan): 2016
Presidents Cup (representing the International team): 2019

See also
 2016 Web.com Tour Finals graduates

References

External links
 
 

Taiwanese male golfers
PGA Tour golfers
Olympic golfers of Taiwan
Golfers at the 2016 Summer Olympics
Golfers at the 2020 Summer Olympics
Olympic medalists in golf
Olympic bronze medalists for Taiwan
Medalists at the 2020 Summer Olympics
Washington Huskies men's golfers
Korn Ferry Tour graduates
Asian Games gold medalists for Chinese Taipei
Asian Games silver medalists for Chinese Taipei
Asian Games bronze medalists for Chinese Taipei
Asian Games medalists in golf
Golfers at the 2006 Asian Games
Medalists at the 2006 Asian Games
Golfers at the 2014 Asian Games
Medalists at the 2014 Asian Games
People from Miaoli County
Taiwanese expatriate sportspeople in the United States
1991 births
Living people